Nipmuck State Forest is a Connecticut state forest. Its  surround Bigelow Hollow State Park in the town of Union and include parcels in Stafford, Ashford, and other towns.

Recreation opportunities
One of the most popular routes is up to and around Breakneck Pond. Other trails are available in other parcels of the forest. Snowmobiling trails are offered in winter. Fishing is popular both in summer and winter (ice fishing). The streams, ponds and lakes feature stocked as well as native trout, small and large mouth bass, and pickerel. Camping is allowed in the back country of the forest.

Mountain Laurel Sanctuary
In the western portion of the forest, a Mountain Laurel Sanctuary is located on Snow Hill.  Mountain laurel thrives here and reaches heights of 15 to 20 feet which is rare for mountain laurel.

See also
 Last Green Valley National Heritage Corridor

References

External links
Bigelow Hollow State Park & Nipmuck State Forest Connecticut Department of Energy and Environmental Protection

 
Connecticut state forests
State forests of the Appalachians
Geography of Tolland County, Connecticut
Parks in Tolland County, Connecticut
Union, Connecticut
Protected areas established in 1905
1905 establishments in Connecticut